Jacob Phillips (born April 1, 1999) is an American football linebacker for the Cleveland Browns of the National Football League (NFL). He played college football at LSU and was drafted by the Browns in the third round of the 2020 NFL Draft.

Early years
Phillips attended East Nashville Magnet High School in Nashville, Tennessee. As a senior in 2016, he was selected Tennessee Mr. Football and played in the U.S. Army All-American Bowl. He was a semifinalist for the 2016 Butkus Award, which is given to the nation's top high school linebacker. A five-star recruit, Phillips was originally committed to play college football at the University of Oklahoma but flipped the commitment to Louisiana State University (LSU).

College career
As a true freshman at LSU in 2017, Phillips played in 12 games, recording 18 tackles. As a sophomore in 2018, he started 11 of 12 games and finished the season with 87 tackles and a sack. Phillips returned as a starter his junior year in 2019.  Following a junior season where he led the team in tackles, Phillips announced that he would forgo his senior year and declared for the 2020 NFL Draft.

Professional career

Phillips was drafted by the Cleveland Browns in the third round with the 97th overall pick of the 2020 NFL Draft. The Browns previously acquired this selection from the Houston Texans by trading Duke Johnson to Houston. Phillips was placed on the reserve/COVID-19 list by the team on December 26, 2020, and activated on December 31.

On September 1, 2021, Phillips was placed on injured reserve with a biceps injury. He was activated on December 11.

Phillips entered the 2022 season as the backup middle linebacker behind Anthony Walker. He became the starter in Week 4 following an injury to Walker. He started the next four games before being placed on injured reserve on October 26, 2022 after suffering a pectoral injury in Week 7.

NFL career statistics

Regular season

References

External links
LSU Tigers bio

1999 births
Living people
Players of American football from Nashville, Tennessee
American football linebackers
LSU Tigers football players
Cleveland Browns players